The Penrhyn quarry is a slate quarry located near Bethesda, North Wales. It has since been superseded in size by slate quarries in China, Spain and the USA. Penrhyn is still Britain's largest slate quarry but its workforce is now nearer 200.

History 
The first reference to slate extraction at Penrhyn is from 1570, when the quarry is mentioned in a Welsh poem. The quarry was developed in the 1770s by Richard Pennant, later Baron Penrhyn. Much of his early working was for local use only as no large scale transport infrastructure was developed until Pennant's involvement. From then on, slates from the quarry were transported to the sea at Port Penrhyn on the narrow gauge Penrhyn Quarry Railway built in 1798, one of the earliest railway lines. In the 19th century the Penrhyn Quarry, along with the Dinorwic quarry, dominated the Welsh slate industry.

In 1868 eighty workers were sacked for failing to vote for George Douglas-Pennant, the son of the owner, in the general election.

The "Great Strike" 

The quarry is significant in the history of the British Labour Movement as the site of two prolonged strikes by workers demanding better pay and safer conditions. The first strike lasted eleven months in 1896. The second began on 22 November 1900 and lasted for three years. Known as "The Great Strike of Penrhyn", this was the longest dispute in British industrial history. During the strike, the community was divided between those who laid down their tools and those who crossed the picket line. Many locals wrote "Nid oes bradwr yn y tŷ hwn" or "There is no traitor in this house" in their front windows.

William John Parry, one of the founders of the North Wales Quarrymen's Union, and an alderman in Bethesda, organised a co-operative to take over several other local quarries and employ locked-out Penrhyn quarrymen. He eventually included Pantdreiniog, Moel Faban and Tanybwlch quarries in his operation, all on the north side of the town.

In the longer term the dispute cast the shadow of unreliability on the North Welsh slate industry, causing orders to drop sharply and thousands of workers to be laid off.

In 2003, on the centenary of the strike, the Transport and General Workers' Union unveiled a plaque in memory of those who participated.

Recent history 
From 1963 until 2007 the quarry was owned and operated by Alfred McAlpine.

In 2007 it was purchased by Kevin Lagan (an Irish businessman who is the owner and chairman of the Lagan Group) and renamed Welsh Slate Ltd. Kevin Lagan and his son Peter (MD of Lagan Building Solutions Ltd) are now directors of Welsh Slate Ltd which also includes the Oakeley quarry in Blaenau Ffestiniog, the Cwt Y Bugail quarry and the Pen Yr Orsedd quarry. The Lagan Group was itself acquired by the Leicestershire-based Breedon Group in 2018.

A part of the site no longer in use for slate extraction is the site of a new adventure tourism facility operated by Zip World. The zip line Velocity 2 flies over an abandoned and partially flooded part of the quarry.

Welsh slate such as that quarried at Penrhyn was designated by the International Union of Geological Sciences as a 'Global Heritage Stone Resource' early in 2019 in recognition of its significant contribution to world architectural heritage.

Railways

See also
 Blondin (quarry equipment) – originated at Penrhyn
 The 2nd Baron Penrhyn – who closed the quarry in response to a strike in 1897

References

External links

 The official website of Welsh Slate Ltd., the owners of Penrhyn quarry
 The quarry's entry (including much description of the site, location map, etc.) on the National Monuments Record of Wales (NMRW)'s https://coflein.org website
 History and photos
 "The Penrhyn Slate Quarry," in Saturday Magazine, No. 12, 8 September 1832, pp. 93.
 The Penrhyn Slate Quarries in North Wales circa 1858, in The Illustrated London News, Vol. XXXII, No. 913, Saturday, 17 April 1858, pp. 392–393.
 History of Bangor Blue Slates In Ireland 

Bethesda, Gwynedd
Llandygai
Open-pit mines
Slate mines in Gwynedd
The Slate Landscape of Northwest Wales